The glandular toadlet (Uperoleia glandulosa) is a species of frog in the family Myobatrachidae.
It is endemic to the arid coast near the Pilbara in Western Australia.
Its natural habitats are subtropical or tropical dry lowland grassland, rivers, intermittent rivers, swamps, intermittent freshwater marshes, and canals and ditches.

References

Uperoleia
Amphibians of Western Australia
Taxonomy articles created by Polbot
Amphibians described in 1985
Frogs of Australia